Hyperkeratotic cutaneous capillary-venous malformation is a cutaneous condition characterized also by inherited cerebral capillary malformations.

See also 
 Lowry–MacLean syndrome
 List of cutaneous conditions

References 

Cutaneous congenital anomalies